Airdrop Peak is a twin-peaked mountain  high at the north end of Commonwealth Range, Antarctica. It is the first prominent feature in Ebony Ridge when approached from the northwest. When New Zealand surveyors were making observations from the higher of the two peaks on December 11, 1959, an R4D aircraft of U.S. Navy Squadron VX-6 flew overhead to drop a spare radio to the expedition whose original one had broken down. So named because of this incident by the New Zealand Alpine Club Antarctic Expedition, 1959–60.

References

Mountains of the Ross Dependency
Shackleton Coast
Dufek Coast